A list of films produced in South Korea in 1974:

References

External links
1974 in South Korea

1974
South Korean
1974 in South Korea